Chikmagalur Assembly constituency is one of the 224 seats in Karnataka State Assembly in India. It is part of Udupi Chikmagalur Lok Sabha seat.

Members of Legislative Assembly 
Source

Election results

1962 Assembly Election
 B. L. Subbamma (INC) : 9717 votes 
 C. M. S. Shastry (PSP) : 6378 votes

2018 Assembly Election
 C T Ravi (BJP) : 70,863 votes  	
 Shankar B L (INC) : 44549

See also 
 Chikkamagaluru district
 List of constituencies of Karnataka Legislative Assembly

References 

Assembly constituencies of Karnataka